The Forgotten Realms Archives is a compilation of the AD&D Forgotten Realms series from the beginning of the series in 1988 through 1994, including 12 complete games. It was released in April 1997, and re-released a year later as a Silver Edition, which included an interactive demo for 1998's Baldur's Gate, and republished in 2001 as part of the Gamefest Interplay collector's series, Gamefest: Forgotten Realms Classics.

Game list
 Gold Box series:
 Pool of Radiance
 Curse of the Azure Bonds
 Secret of the Silver Blades
 Pools of Darkness
 Gateway to the Savage Frontier
 Treasures of the Savage Frontier
 The Eye of the Beholder series:
 Eye of the Beholder
 Eye of the Beholder II: The Legend of Darkmoon
 Eye of the Beholder III: Assault on Myth Drannor
 And also:
 Hillsfar
 Dungeon Hack
 Menzoberranzan
 A demo version of Blood & Magic, including the source code.
 A demo version of Baldur's Gate (1998 and 2001 re-releases only)

Reception
Power Play gave the collection a "good" rating.

References

External links

1997 video games
DOS games
DOS-only games
Forgotten Realms video games
Interplay Entertainment games
Role-playing video games
Video game compilations
Video games developed in the United States